= Hendrica Leurs =

Hendrica Leurs (1794–1870), was a Dutch educator. She was the central figure in a famous Dutch court case in 1837.

She was the daughter of the surgeon William Leurs (ca 1753–1801) and Maria Anthonia Bergman (d. 1802). Leurs worked as a governess, and successfully managed her own girls' school in Utrecht from 1833. In 1836, large amounts of forged banknotes circulated in the Netherlands. The banknotes were traced to Leurs, who was put on trial in 1837. She denied the accusation and claimed the notes were given to her by a bank clerk. She was charged with having manufactured the banknotes herself to distribute to uneducated people who would not observe her handwriting on them, and the prosecutor demanded the death penalty on the grounds that she could have caused a financial crisis. Her defence lawyer, however, claimed that the spelling errors on the false notes could not be expected from the hand of a school teacher, that she did not have time to manufacture them and that her school was successful and highly regarded and that she did not have an economic reason to engage in forgery. Hendrica Leurs was acquitted of the charges, but she was unable to keep her school and emigrated to the Dutch East Indies, where she opened a school in Surakarta.
